Route F26 or Sprengisandsleið is a highland gravel road in Iceland, running through the Sprengisandur area between the glaciers Hofsjökull and Vatnajökull.

With its 200 km, it is the longest of the Icelandic highland roads. Its southern end is at the lake Þórisvatn, to the northeast of the volcano Hekla, and its northern end is the south part of Bárðardalur valley, to the southwest of lake Mývatn.

External links
Current condition of Icelandic roads

Roads in Iceland
Gravel roads